Henry Neumann Zayas is an attorney, and a former state senator for the District of San Juan (PNP-R)  Former Secretary of Sports and Recreation of Puerto Rico.

After finishing high school entered Georgetown University in Washington, D.C., where he earned a Bachelor in business administration with honors in 1972. Once
completed University, Served in the United States Army. Returned to the island for study at the University of Puerto Rico School of Law, where he obtained the degree of Juris Doctor for the 1975.

A former basketball player, he served for many years as president of Puerto Rico's National Superior Basketball league.

In March 2008, he aspired to become one of the New Progressive Party of Puerto Rico's six at-large Senate candidates at the PNP primaries, but ended up in seventh place.

In June 2008, he was selected as a member of the 2010 Central and Caribbean Games Organizing Committee.  The Games were held in Mayagüez during the summer of 2010.  To facilitate the government's collaboration with the Games, Governor Luis Fortuño appointed him to chair a 25-member coordinating committee, composed of Puerto Rico government agency heads.

On October 26, 2015, Neumann announced his Senate candidacy on behalf of the New Progressive Party of Puerto Rico. On June 21, 2022, Neumann announced his resignation to the Senate of Puerto Rico, effective June 30, 2022.

References

Georgetown University alumni
Living people
Members of the Senate of Puerto Rico
Members of the 15th Cabinet of Puerto Rico
New Progressive Party (Puerto Rico) politicians
Presidents pro tempore of the Senate of Puerto Rico
Puerto Rican lawyers
Puerto Rican sports executives and administrators
Secretaries of Sports and Recreation of Puerto Rico
Year of birth missing (living people)
Latino conservatism in the United States